At 2,257 metres, the Soiernspitze is the highest mountain in the Soiern Group in the Bavarian Karwendel range. Its summit may be climbed either from Seinsbachtal or from the Soiernhäusern by the lakes of Soiernseen in an easy mountain hike. The ridge walk to the nearby Schöttelkarspitze peak requires sure-footedness.

References

External links 

Mountains of the Alps
Mountains of Bavaria
Two-thousanders of Germany
Karwendel